The Guerin Sportivo is an Italian sports magazine. It is the oldest sport magazine in the world.

Journalists who worked for the magazine include Gianni Brera, Indro Montanelli, Giorgio Tosatti, Darwin Pastorin, Carlo Nesti, Mario Sconcerti, Stefano Disegni and Rino Tommasi.

History and profile
Founded in 1912 in Turin, it is published every month.

The title and the logo, depicting a medieval knight throwing a javelin, are inspired by the lead character in Andrea di Barberino's chivalric romance Il Guerrin Meschino ("The Wretched Guerrin"), written in 1410.

Originally, it was printed on green paper, whence the popular nickname verdolino, and also housed satirical panels. Characters used in his panels by artist Carlin (a zebra for Juventus, a female wolf for Roma, a devil for Milan and others) inspired most of the symbols of Italian sides used today.

In the mid-1970s, Guerin Sportivo moved from newspaper to magazine format, starting to include a greater number of photos. Since its origins, most of the content was devoted to football, other sports being given less detail. Since the 1990s, virtually all pages are dedicated to football.

Guerin Sportivo is published by Conti Editore. The publisher itself is owned by the Corriere dello Sport – Stadio and Tuttosport groups. The two daily sports newspapers are owned by Roberto Amodei.

Circulation
In 2007, Guerin Sportivo had a circulation of 45,067 copies.

Awards
Over the years, Guerin Sportivo has presented several annual awards.

Guerin d'Oro 

From 1976 to 2015, the Guerin d'Oro was awarded to the best Serie A football player.

Bravo Award 

From 1975 to 2015, the Bravo Award was awarded to the most outstanding young European footballer.

Player of the Year (1979–1986) 
The winner was chosen by reporters, readers and writers of the magazine from many countries. It was first awarded in 1979 and was discontinued in 1986. In 1987, Guerin Sportivo held a vote between Diego Maradona and Ruud Gullit to decide the best player of the year. Diego Maradona won by a small margin.

Manager of the Year 
Guerin Sportivo also chose a Manager of the Year in 1983, 1984 and 1986.

Team of the Year 
Guerin Sportivo also chose a National Team of the Year and a Club Team of the Year in 1983, 1984 and 1986.

All-Star Team 
The Player of the Year was chosen from 1980 to 1983 based on appearances in All-Star team votes. In 1984 and 1986, a separate vote for an All-Star team was conducted.

See also
Guerin d'Oro
Bravo Award
L'albo d'Oro

References

External links
 

1912 establishments in Italy
Italian-language magazines
Magazines established in 1912
Magazines published in Turin
Monthly magazines published in Italy
Sports magazines
Sports mass media in Italy